The 2003–04 Hazfi Cup was the 17th season of the Iranian football knockout competition.

Bracket
Teams from same city meet only once

Semi-final

Final

Leg 1

Leg 2

References

2003
2003–04 domestic association football cups
2003–04 in Iranian football